James Drought may refer to:
 James William Drought, American author
 James Drought (theologian), Irish academic